Promethium(III) fluoride or promethium trifluoride is a salt of promethium and fluorine with the formula PmF3. 

Promethium(III) fluoride is sparingly soluble in water. It reacts with metallic lithium to yield lithium fluoride and metallic promethium:

References

Promethium compounds
Fluorides
Lanthanide halides